Summer Street Historic District may refer to:

Summer Street Historic District (Adams, Massachusetts), listed on the National Register of Historic Places in Berkshire County, Massachusetts
Summer Street Historic District (St. Johnsbury, Vermont), listed on the National Register of Historic Places in Caledonia County, Vermont